Calvin Coolidge Irvin (November 28, 1924 – November 25, 2017) was an American Negro league baseball shortstop and college basketball coach.

A native of Haleburg, Alabama, Irvin was the brother of Baseball Hall of Famer Monte Irvin. Younger brother Cal attended Orange High School and Morgan State University, where he played basketball and football. He played for the Newark Eagles during their 1946 Negro World Series championship season, and played with the New York Black Yankees in 1947.

Irvin went on to become the athletic director and head basketball coach at North Carolina A&T State University, coaching there for 18 years, and winning four Central Intercollegiate Athletic Association titles. A member of the North Carolina Sports Hall of Fame, Irvin died in Greensboro, North Carolina in 2017 at age 92.

References

External links
 and Seamheads
 Cal Irvin at Negro League Baseball Players Association

1924 births
2017 deaths
Newark Eagles players
New York Black Yankees players
North Carolina A&T Aggies men's basketball coaches
Baseball shortstops
Orange High School (New Jersey) alumni
People from Henry County, Alabama
People from Orange, New Jersey
Sportspeople from Essex County, New Jersey
Baseball players from Alabama
Morgan State Bears men's basketball players
Morgan State Bears football players
20th-century African-American sportspeople
21st-century African-American people